Longwan (龙湾) may refer to the following locations in China:

 Longwan District, Wenzhou, Zhejiang
 Longwan, Qianjiang, Hubei, town in Qianjiang, Hubei
 Longwan Township, Du'an County, in Du'an Yao Autonomous County, Guangxi
 Longwan Township, Xiong County, Hebei